Agnishwar (অগ্নীশ্বর) is a 1975 Indian Bengali-language drama film about the life and career of a patriotic, idealistic doctor. The story is inspired by the Bengali novel Agnishwar written by Balai Chand Mukhopadhyay, based on the life of his teacher, Banabihari Mukhopadhyay . Directed by Arabinda Mukhopadhyay, the film stars Uttam Kumar, Madhabi Mukherjee, Partha Mukherjee and Tarun Kumar.

Plot 
The plot revolves around a patriotic doctor who lends moral backbone to the broken society of Bengal.

Cast 
 Uttam Kumar as Agnishwar Mukhopadhyay
 Madhabi Mukherjee as Agnishwar's wife
 Tarun Kumar as Sarbeshwar
 Partha Mukherjee as Agnishwar's son
  Dilip Roy   as Khagen
 Sumitra Mukherjee as Suchhanda

References

External links 
 

1975 drama films
1975 films
Bengali-language Indian films
Films based on Indian novels
1970s Bengali-language films
Indian drama films
Films based on works by Balai Chand Mukhopadhyay